The Princes Shuisky was a Rurikid family of Boyars descending from Grand Duke Dimitri Konstantinovich of Vladimir-Suzdal and Prince Andrey Yaroslavich, brother to Alexander Nevsky. The surname is derived from the town of Shuya, of which the Shuiskys gained ownership in 1403. From 1606 to 1610, Vasili Shuisky ruled as tsar over Russia during the Time of Troubles.

Early service in Muscovy
The foundations for their fortunes in Muscovite service were laid by Prince Vasily Vasilievich "Bledny" ("the Pale"), who was dispatched by Ivan III to govern Pskov and then Nizhny Novgorod (1478–80). The following year, he devastated Livonia and was sent as a governor to Novgorod. In 1487, he was recorded as leading a Russian contingent against Kazan. The Shuyskys represented a senior line among the descendants of Vsevolod the Big Nest and therefore treated the ruling princes of Muscovy, who were descended from a junior line, with arrogance.

The Regency
Vasily Bledny's grand nephew, Prince Vasily Vasilievich "Nemoy" ("the Mute") was Grand Prince Vasily III's taciturn aide-de-camp who accompanied him on every military campaign and became an éminence grise of Muscovite politics. In 1517, he defeated forces of Poland and Lithuania under Konstantin Ostrogski as part of the 4th Muscovite-Lithuanian War. Six years later, Vasily Nemoy led a Russian expedition along the Volga against Kazan. Upon the death of Vasily III's widow, Elena Glinskaya, he challenged the authority of Prince Ivan Belsky, procured his incarceration, married Anastasia of Kazan (Ivan III's granddaughter), and proclaimed himself regent for Vasily III's heir, the young Ivan IV, in 1538.

Vasily Nemoy died later that year, and the power of the regency devolved upon his younger brother, Prince Ivan Vasilievich Shuysky, who began his rule by ousting Metropolitan Daniel from office and contriving the election of Joasaphus Skripitsin as the new head of the Russian Orthodox Church. He also released from prison his cousin, Prince Andrey Mikhailovich, who had governed Yugoria and Nizhny Novgorod during Vasily III's reign before having been incarcerated on charges of high treason.

Pending Ivan IV's majority, Ivan and Andrey were de facto rulers of Russia. Their arrogant and unruly behavior provoked the anger and frustration of the young sovereign, thus sowing seeds for his future wide-scale crackdown on the Russian nobility. In one of his letters to Prince Kurbsky Ivan painfully recalls that Prince Andrey Shuysky had put his dirty boots on his bed. The matter ended with Andrey being thrown into a cell full of hungry dogs and devoured by them (1543).

In 1540, Metropolitan Joasaphus managed to recall Ivan Belsky from exile, helping him clear the court of the Shuyskys. Two years later, Ivan Shuysky instigated a military revolt and again gained power. He had Macarius elected the new metropolitan and regent, but Macarius gradually ousted him from the Kremlin and persuaded him to resign his powers. Ivan Vasilevich Shuysky died in semi-obscurity in 1546.

Military heroes

Andrey Mikhailovich's elder brother, Prince Ivan Mikhailovich Pleten', was one of the leading Muscovite generals between 1531 and his death in 1559. During the regency of Elena Glinskaya he served as the governor of Moscow and of Kholmogory. In 1540, he was put in charge of the Russian army operating in Livonia. In 1542 he routed the Crimean Tatars. Two years later, he was recorded as operating against Kazan. In the late 1540s, he administrated the royal palaces. In 1553, Ivan Pleten' signed an armistice with the Grand Duchy of Lithuania.

During the later part of Ivan IV's reign, the Shuyskys stood aloof from the macabre politics of the Oprichnina. Probably the most skillful of Ivan's generals was Prince Alexander Borisovich Gorbaty-Shuysky, who advised the Tsar on military reform in the 1550s and presided over the Russian army during the siege and capture of Kazan in 1552. He was executed on fabricated charges in February 1565.

Prince Ivan Petrovich Shuysky, also from a cadet line of the family, commanded the defence of Pskov during its prolonged siege by Stefan Báthory. Tsar Feodor, upon making Ivan Petrovich his military advisor, devolved on him enormous revenues supplied by Pskov's merchants. Soon enough, however, the Pskovian hero was found guilty of conspiring against Boris Godunov and exiled into Belozersk, where he died on November 16, 1588.

The last of the Shuiskys
The last of the Russian Shuyskys were four brothers - Vasily Ivanovich Shuysky (briefly Russian Tsar as Vasily IV), Dmitry Ivanovich Shuisky (infamous for having poisoned his brilliant cousin, Prince Mikhail Vasilyevich Skopin-Shuysky), Alexander Ivanovich Shuysky, and Ivan Ivanovich Shuysky "Pugovka" ("the Button"). All four were boyars and grandsons of Andrey Mikhailovich.

The last scion of the family, Ivan Pugovka, was put in charge of the courts in Moscow during the reign of his brother-in-law Vasily IV. Pugovka outlived his brothers after he was taken with them into captivity in Poland as a result of Vasily IV's fall in 1610, and managed to return and marry a sister of Tsarina Maria Dolgorukova.  Upon his death in 1638. The familj is not extinct and the still have the same name but spells it a different way.

Ivan Dmitrievich "Gubka" (the Sponge) Szujski's descendants received an Jasnahorodka estate (near Makariv), and one branch reportedly survives in Poland, who do not use their title.

References

Further reading
 
  (обл.)

 
Russian noble families
Tsardom of Russia people
Russian military leaders